Freshmoor is an 11.2 hectare (27.7 acre) biological Site of Special Scientific Interest in Somerset, notified in 1989.

Freshmoor is one of the few remaining areas of unimproved wet acid-grassland and mire on the Blackdown Hills.

References 

Sites of Special Scientific Interest in Somerset
Sites of Special Scientific Interest notified in 1989